Davis Mountains State Park is a  state park located in the Davis Mountains in Jeff Davis County, Texas. The closest town is Fort Davis, Texas. The original portion of the park was deeded to Texas Parks and Wildlife Department by a local family. 

Original improvements were accomplished by the Civilian Conservation Corps (CCC) in 1933, during the Great Depression. After this federal investment, the park was opened to the public around 1938. Indian Lodge was expanded and campground facilities were added by the state in 1967.

History 
Interest in developing a state park in the Davis Mountains began in earnest in 1923 when the Texas Legislature directed the newly created State Parks Board to investigate the area. However, the Parks Board failed to secure any land donations and had no appropriations to buy the land. 

By 1933, the Great Depression had so devastated the local economy that landowners agreed to donate 560 acres for the park. CCC Companies 879 and 881 arrived in June 1933 and began organizing their encampment, which they named Camp Washington Seawell, after the first commander of nearby Fort Davis. Their developments in the park included roads, an overlook shelter, two mess halls, stone picnic tables, fireplaces and steps, a latrine and "Indian Lodge," a motel and visitor facility.

Features 

The park is next to the Fort Davis National Historic Site and the two are connected by four miles of hiking trails. Within the park is the "Indian Lodge", an adobe motel with thirty-nine rooms. Sixteen were built by the Civilian Conservation Corps during the 1930s (completed in 1939) and twenty-four were added in a 1967 expansion by Texas Parks and Wildlife. A large bird blind next to the main road offers enclosed and open viewing areas for the many species of birds that are attracted to the feeders near the blind.

The park has seven miles of equestrian trails in the special use Limpia Canyon Primitive Area, the section of the park north of Texas State Highway 118.

Flora 
Davis Mountains State Park receives more rain than the surrounding desert. A variety of trees are found here, such as Mexican pinyon (Pinus cembroides), Emory oak (Quercus emoryi), gray oak (Quercus grisea) and one-seed juniper (Juniperus monosperma). Shrubs such as scarlet bouvardia (Bouvardia ternifolia), little-leaf leadtree (Leucaena retusa), trompillo (Ipomoea hederifolia), evergreen sumac (Rhus virens), fragrant sumac (Rhus aromatica), Apache plume (Fallugia paradoxa), little walnut (Juglans microcarpa), tree cholla (Cylindropuntia imbricata), Torrey yucca (Yucca torreyi), catclaw acacia (Acacia greggii), and agarita (Mahonia trifoliolata) abound.

Fauna 
Montezuma quail are regularly observed in the park. Woodhouse's scrub jays, white-winged doves, curve-billed thrashers, white-tailed deer and rock squirrels are among the most common wildlife seen. Collared peccary, cougars, and American black bears have also been recorded in the park.

Gallery

See also 

 List of Texas state parks

References

External links 
"Davis Mountains State Park," Texas Parks and Wildlife.
Film of Davis Mountains State Park from Adventure at Our Door (c. 1959) on the Texas Archive of the Moving Image

Protected areas of Jeff Davis County, Texas
State parks of Texas
Civilian Conservation Corps in Texas
Protected areas established in 1938
1938 establishments in Texas